This is a list of magazines published in the Persian language.

See also
Media of Iran
List of newspapers in Iran

External links
 List of Iranian magazines in Persian - 
 MagIran - Database of the Iranian Press
 Persia Page - Persian Language Magazines

Magazines
Persian-language